Methylene imine is an organic compound with the formula . The simplest imine, it is a stable, colorless gas that has been detected throughout the universe. Structural parameters determined by microwave spectroscopy include a C=N bond length of 1.27 Å, an N–H bond length of 1.02 Å and an HNC bond angle of 110.5°. Because unhindered imines polymerize or oligomerize when concentrated, methylene imine has not been isolated as a liquid or bulk solid. Attempted synthesis of methylene imine from the reaction of ammonia and formaldehyde produces hexamethylenetetramine.

References

Imines